Rajesh Tailang is an Indian actor. He is best known to international audiences for his role in Siddharth, for which he garnered a Canadian Screen Award nomination for Best Actor at the 2nd Canadian Screen Awards. He also wrote the dialogues for Siddharth and for Amal. Besides being an actor and writer, he is a poet as well. He is the brother of late cartoonist Sudhir Tailang.

He has also appeared in the films Phantom, Dev, Hazaar Chaurasi Ki Maa, Thakshak, Amal, Umrika and The Second Best Exotic Marigold Hotel, and the television series Shanti. He also had supporting roles in Netflix Originals Selection Day and Delhi Crime along with Amazon Prime Original Mirzapur.

Filmography

Films

Short films

Web series

References

External links
 

Indian male television actors
Indian male film actors
Living people
Year of birth missing (living people)